Sumatra is one of the Sunda Islands of western Indonesia. It is the largest island that is fully within Indonesian territory, as well as the sixth-largest island in the world at 473,481 km2 (182,812 mi.2), not including adjacent islands such as the Simeulue, Nias, Mentawai, Enggano, Riau Islands, Bangka Belitung and Krakatoa archipelago.

Sumatra is an elongated landmass spanning a diagonal northwest–southeast axis. The Indian Ocean borders the northwest, west, and southwest coasts of Sumatra, with the island chain of Simeulue, Nias, Mentawai, and Enggano off the western coast. In the northeast, the narrow Strait of Malacca separates the island from the Malay Peninsula, which is an extension of the Eurasian continent. In the southeast, the narrow Sunda Strait, containing the Krakatoa Archipelago, separates Sumatra from Java. The northern tip of Sumatra is near the Andaman Islands, while off the southeastern coast lie the islands of Bangka and Belitung, Karimata Strait and the Java Sea. The Bukit Barisan mountains, which contain several active volcanoes, form the backbone of the island, while the northeastern area contains large plains and lowlands with swamps, mangrove forest and complex river systems. The equator crosses the island at its centre in West Sumatra and Riau provinces. The climate of the island is tropical, hot, and humid. Lush tropical rain forest once dominated the landscape.

Sumatra has a wide range of plant and animal species but has lost almost 50% of its tropical rainforest in the last 35 years. Many species are now critically endangered, such as the Sumatran ground cuckoo, the Sumatran tiger, the Sumatran elephant, the Sumatran rhinoceros, and the Sumatran orangutan. Deforestation on the island has also resulted in serious seasonal smoke haze over neighbouring countries, such as the 2013 Southeast Asian haze which caused considerable tensions between Indonesia and affected countries Malaysia and Singapore.

Etymology
The earliest known mention of the current form "Sumatra" was in 1017, when the local king Haji Sumatrabhumi ("king of the land of Sumatra") sent an envoy to China. The island has also been known by other names, including Andalas or Percha Island.

Later in the 14th century the local form "Sumatra" became popular abroad due to the rising power of the kingdom of Samudera Pasai and the subsequent Sultanate of Aceh.

From then on, subsequent European writers mostly used Sumatra or similar forms of the name for the entire island.

History 

By the year 692, the Melayu Kingdom was absorbed by Srivijaya.

Srivijaya influence waned in the 11th century year 1025 after being defeated by the Chola Empire in southern India. By the end of the 12th century Srivijaya had been reduced to a small kingdom, and its dominant role in South Sumatra with the last king ratu Sekekhummong. At the same time, the spread of Islam in Indonesia occurred gradually and indirectly, starting from the western regions of Indonesia such as the Sumatra area which became the first place for the spread of Islam in the archipelago then Java to the eastern regions of Indonesia, Sulawesi and Maluku. The island of Sumatra is also an area in the archipelago that received the spread of Islam first compared to other islands or other areas. The island of Sumatra became the first area to receive the spread of Islam because of the position of the island of Sumatra which is close to the Malacca strait. The initial process of Islamization related to trade and also the formation of the kingdom. Islam entered Sumatra through pious Arabs and Indian traders in the 6th and 7th centuries AD. At the beginning and end of the 13th century the formation of the kingdom, the king of the Samudra kingdom had converted to Islam. Marco Polo visited the island in 1292, and his fellow Italian Odoric of Pordenone in 1321.

Moroccan scholar Ibn Battuta visited with the sultan for 15 days, noting the city of Samudra was "a fine, big city with wooden walls and towers", and another two months on his return journey. Samudra was succeeded by the powerful Aceh Sultanate, which survived to the 20th century. With the coming of the Dutch, the many Sumatran princely states gradually fell under their control. Aceh, in the north, was the major obstacle, as the Dutch were involved in the long and costly Aceh War (1873–1903).

The Free Aceh Movement fought against Indonesian government forces in the Aceh Insurgency from 1976 to 2005. Security crackdowns in 2001 and 2002 resulted in several thousand civilian deaths.

The island was heavily impacted by both the 1883 Krakatoa eruption and the 2004 Boxing Day Tsunami.

Demographics 

Sumatra is not particularly densely populated, with 125 people per km2 – about 59,185,500  people in total (according to official estimates as at mid 2021). Because of its size, it is nonetheless the fifth most populous island in the world.

Ethnic groups 
The largest indigenous ethnic groups in Sumatra are Malays, Minangkabaus, Bataks, Acehnese, and Lampungs. Other major non-indigenous ethnic groups are Javanese, Sundanese, and Chinese.

Below are 11 largest ethnic groups in Sumatra based on the 2010 census (including Riau Islands, Bangka Belitung, Nias, Mentawai, Simeulue and islands around it)

Languages

There are over 52 languages spoken, all of which (except Chinese and Tamil) belong to the Malayo-Polynesian branch of the Austronesian language family. Within Malayo-Polynesian, they are divided into several sub-branches: Chamic (which are represented by Acehnese in which its closest relatives are languages spoken by Ethnic Chams in Cambodia and Vietnam), Malayic (Malay, Minangkabau and other closely related languages), Northwest Sumatra–Barrier Islands (Batak languages, Gayo and others), Lampungic (includes Proper Lampung and Komering) and Bornean (represented by Rejang in which its closest linguistic relatives are Bukar Sadong and Land Dayak spoken in West Kalimantan and Sarawak (Malaysia)). Northwest Sumatra–Barrier Islands and Lampungic branches are endemic to the island. Like all parts of Indonesia, Indonesian (which was based on Riau Malay) is the official language and the main lingua franca. Although Sumatra has its own local lingua franca, variants of Malay like Medan Malay and Palembang Malay are popular in North and South Sumatra, especially in urban areas. Minangkabau (Padang dialect) is popular in West Sumatra, some parts of North Sumatra, Bengkulu, Jambi and Riau (especially in Pekanbaru and areas bordered with West Sumatra) while Acehnese is also used as an inter-ethnic means of communication in some parts of Aceh province.

Religion

The majority of people in Sumatra are Muslims (87.1%), while 10.7% are Christians, and less than 2% are Buddhists and Hindus.

Administration 
Sumatra is one of seven geographical regions of Indonesia which includes its adjacent smaller islands. Sumatra was one of the eight original provinces of Indonesia between 1945 and 1948. Including adjacent archipelagoes normally included with Sumatra (such as the Riau Islands, Nias and the Bangka-Belitung group), it now covers ten of Indonesia's 37 provinces, which are set out below with their areas and populations.

Geography 

At its widest point, the island spans . The interior of the island is dominated by two geographical regions: the Barisan Mountains in the west and swampy plains in the east. Sumatra is the closest Indonesian island to mainland Asia.

To the southeast is Java, separated by the Sunda Strait. To the north is the Malay Peninsula (located on the Asian mainland), separated by the Strait of Malacca. To the east is Borneo, across the Karimata Strait. West of the island is the Indian Ocean.

The Great Sumatran fault (a strike-slip fault), and the Sunda megathrust (a subduction zone), run the entire length of the island along its west coast. On 26 December 2004, the western coast and islands of Sumatra, particularly Aceh province, were struck by a tsunami following the Indian Ocean earthquake. This was the longest earthquake recorded, lasting between 500 and 600 seconds. More than 170,000 Indonesians were killed, primarily in Aceh. Other recent earthquakes to strike Sumatra include the 2005 Nias–Simeulue earthquake and the 2010 Mentawai earthquake and tsunami.

Lake Toba is the site of a supervolcanic eruption that occurred around 74,000 years ago, representing a climate-changing event.

The most important rivers in Sumatra belong to the catchment area of the South China Sea. Heading north to south, the Rokan, Siak, Kampar, Indragiri, Batanghari flow into the Malacca Strait, while the island's largest river, the Musi, flows into the sea at Bangka Strait in the south.

To the east, big rivers carry silt from the mountains, forming the vast lowland interspersed by swamps. Even if mostly unsuitable for farming, the area is currently of great economic importance for Indonesia. It produces oil from both above and below the soil – palm oil and petroleum.

Sumatra is the largest producer of Indonesian coffee. Small-holders grow Arabica coffee (Coffea arabica) in the highlands, while Robusta (Coffea canephora) is found in the lowlands. Arabica coffee from the regions of Gayo, Lintong and Sidikilang is typically processed using the Giling Basah (wet hulling) technique, which gives it a heavy body and low acidity.

Sumatra is a highly seismic island, huge earthquakes have been recorded throughout history, in 1797 an 8.9 earthquake shook Western Sumatra, in 1833 a 9.2 earthquake shook Bengkulu and Western Sumatra both events caused large tsunamis. They are very common throughout the coastal area of the west and center of the island, tsunamis are common due to the high seismicity in the area.

Largest cities 

By population, Medan is the largest city in Sumatra. Medan is also the most visited and developed city in Sumatra.

Flora and fauna 

Sumatra supports a wide range of vegetation types that are home to a rich variety of species, including 17 endemic genera of plants. Unique species include the Sumatran pine which dominates the Sumatran tropical pine forests of the higher mountainsides in the north of the island and rainforest plants such as Rafflesia arnoldii (the world's largest individual flower), and the titan arum (the world's largest unbranched inflorescence).

The island is home to 201 mammal species and 580 bird species. There are nine endemic mammal species on mainland Sumatra and 14 more endemic to the nearby Mentawai Islands. There are about 300 freshwater fish species in Sumatra. There are 93 amphibian species in Sumatra, 21 of which are endemic to Sumatra.

The Sumatran tiger, Sumatran rhinoceros, Sumatran elephant, Sumatran ground cuckoo, Sumatran orangutan and Tapanuli orangutan are all critically endangered, indicating the highest level of threat to their survival. In October 2008, the Indonesian government announced a plan to protect Sumatra's remaining forests.

The island includes more than 10 national parks, including three which are listed as the Tropical Rainforest Heritage of Sumatra World Heritage Site – Gunung Leuser National Park, Kerinci Seblat National Park and Bukit Barisan Selatan National Park. The Berbak National Park is one of three national parks in Indonesia listed as a wetland of international importance under the Ramsar Convention.

Rail transport
Several unconnected railway networks built during Netherlands East Indies exist in Sumatra, such as the ones connecting Banda Aceh-Lhokseumawe-Besitang-Medan-Tebingtinggi-Pematang Siantar-Rantau Prapat in Northern Sumatra (the Banda Aceh-Besitang section was closed in 1971, but is currently being rebuilt). Padang-Solok-Bukittinggi in West Sumatra, and Bandar Lampung-Palembang-Lahat-Lubuk Linggau in Southern Sumatra.

See also 

 Architecture of Sumatra
 Bukit Seguntang
 Communism in Sumatra
 Music of Sumatra

References

Further reading 
 
 William Marsden, The History of Sumatra, (1783); 3rd ed. (1811) freely available online.

External links 

 

 
Greater Sunda Islands
Maritime Southeast Asia
Islands of the Indian Ocean
Populated places in Indonesia
Islands of Indonesia